Archibald Jack (21 July 1913 – 13 January 1997) was a British modern pentathlete. He competed at the 1936 Summer Olympics.

References

External links
 

1913 births
1997 deaths
British male modern pentathletes
Olympic modern pentathletes of Great Britain
Modern pentathletes at the 1936 Summer Olympics